Elahe Hiptoola is an Indian film producer and former actress. Her credits include producer of 3 Deewarein, Hyderabad Blues 2, Iqbal, Dor, and Dhanak.

Early life
Elahe Hiptoola was born in Mumbai and resides in Hyderabad.

Career
Hiptoola frequently works with producer Nagesh Kukunoor. Their collaborations include  Hyderabad Blues, Rockford, 3 Deewarein, Bollywood Calling, Hyderabad Blues 2, Iqbal, Dor, Bombay to Bangkok, Aashayein, 8 x 10 Tasveer, Mod and  Lakshmi.

Lamakaan 
In 2010, Hiptoola co-founded a cultural center called Lamakaan (a place without boundaries) in Hyderabad.

Filmography
As producer

As actor

External links

References

Indian film actresses
Living people
Actresses from Andhra Pradesh
Year of birth missing (living people)